Chanakhi is a traditional Georgian dish of lamb stew with tomatoes, aubergines, potatoes, greens and garlic.

Preparation 
Chanakhi is preferably prepared in individual clay pots and served with bread and cheese. Lamb is placed in the pot with already melted butter. Onions, eggplants, potatoes, chopped greens and tomatoes are added in separate layers. After pouring the water, the dish is cooked slowly in the oven for 4.5-5 hours.

See also
 Chakapuli
 Piti
 Ghivetch
 Türlü
 List of lamb dishes

References

Cuisine of Georgia (country)
Lamb dishes